Raymond is a town in southern Alberta, Canada that is surrounded by the County of Warner No. 5. It is south of Lethbridge at the junction of Highway 52 and Highway 845. Raymond is known for its annual rodeo during the first week of July and the large population of members of the Church of Jesus Christ of Latter-day Saints (LDS Church). Raymond is also significant for its connection to the history of the Japanese experience in Alberta. The town has a rich history in high school sports, basketball, Canadian football, Judo and women's rugby. Raymond was recently mentioned as one of the first communities in Alberta to become a net-zero solar-powered community, after having installed solar panels on most town buildings.

History 

Raymond was founded in 1901 by mining magnate and industrialist Jesse Knight, who named the town after his son, Raymond. Knight's plans to build a sugar factory based on locally grown sugar beets attracted 1,500 settlers in a few years.

Raymond was incorporated as a village in the North-West Territories (NWT) on May 30, 1902. It incorporated as a town in the NWT 13 months later on July 1, 1903.

Demographics 

The population of the Town of Raymond according to its 2019 municipal census is 4,241, a  change from its 2017 municipal census population of 4,037.

In the 2016 Census of Population conducted by Statistics Canada, the Town of Raymond recorded a population of 3,708 living in 1,134 of its 1,259 total private dwellings, a  change from its 2011 population of 3,743.

Visible minorities 
As of 2006, approximately 3.0% of the town's population were visible minorities. Of those minorities, 50 people identified themselves as Japanese, 40 as Black, and 10 as South Asian.

Indigenous 
In 2006, there were 110 Indigenous Canadians resident in the town.

Religion 
A majority of Raymondites are members of the LDS Church. In the town, the church has built four meetinghouses, which house eleven separate congregations and which form one stake. (The church's closest temple, the Cardston Alberta Temple, is located 60 kilometres (37 mi) southwest in Cardston.) Raymond also has Baptist, Mennonite, and United Church of Canada congregations. Until its temple was relocated to Lethbridge in 2006, the Raymond Buddhist Church was the oldest continually used Buddhist sanctuary in Canada.

Charitable giving 
Statistics Canada has reported that Raymond ranks among the top five communities in Canada for the highest level of charitable donations per capita, which is partially due to the town population's high rate of tithes given to the LDS Church.

Attractions 
In 1902, one year after it was founded, Raymond held an outdoor rodeo and called it a stampede; this was Canada's first organized rodeo event. Since the inaugural event, the Raymond Stampede has been held annually. It is currently held in conjunction with Raymond's Heritage Days celebration between June 30 and July 1 every summer.

Raymond Heritage Days are held annually during the first week of July to celebrate the founding of Raymond. Events and activities include family softball, fireworks, midnight golfing, a fair, a pancake breakfast, a parade and the Raymond Stampede.

Raymond is home to the Raymond Judo Club, the first judo club in Alberta. The club was formed by Yoshio Katsuta in 1943.

The Raymond Aquatic Centre opened in 2010. It features two small waterslides, a junior Olympic-sized pool for lane swimming, diving boards, a climbing wall, a baby pool, and an eating area. The aquatic centre holds 1,000,000 litres of water during the summer and attracts up to 500 visitors a day.

The Raymond Buddhist Church is one of the oldest buildings in Raymond and the only remaining public building from the town's pioneer days. The building is a designated Provincial Historic Resource. It is significant for its association with two prominent religious communities in Raymond, the LDS Church and the Japanese Buddhists. It is also the site of the Japanese Experience in Alberta National Historic Event.

The Raymond Community Centre, also a designated Provincial Historic Resource, contains the Raymond Public Library and the Broadway Theatre.

Climate 

Raymond has a semi-arid climate (Köppen climate classification BSk) it is part of the Palliser's Triangle.
Raymond is very windy this is due to the rocky mountains to the west.

Notable people 
 Earl W. Bascom, rodeo innovator, artist/sculptor
 Ted E. Brewerton, LDS Church general authority 
 "Suicide Ted" Elder (1897–1981), seven-time World Champion Trick and Fancy Rider 1926 to 1932
 Lloyd Fairbanks, professional football player
 Skouson Harker, professional basketball player
 Jim Hillyer, politician, Member of Parliament
 Jennie B. Knight, LDS religious leader
 Raymond Knight, founder of the Raymond Stampede
 Brett Ralph, professional Canadian football player
 Brock Ralph, professional Canadian football player
 W. Cleon Skousen, author and political commentator
 Phil Tollestrup, Olympics basketball player and member of the Canadian Basketball Hall of Fame
William R. Walker, LDS Church general authority
Wendy Watson Nelson, therapist, professor, author

See also 
List of communities in Alberta
List of towns in Alberta
Temple Hill (Warner County, Alberta)
John W. Taylor

References 

 Lawrence Turner (ed.) (1993) Raymond Remembered : Settlers, Sugar and Stampedes : A History of the Town and People of Raymond (Raymond, AB: Town of Raymond) 
 Terrence C. Smith & Reed Turner (eds.) (2001). A Planting of the Lord : A Century of the Latter-day Saints in Raymond, 1901–2001 (Raymond, AB: Raymond Alberta Stake)

External links 

 
1902 establishments in the Northwest Territories
Latter-day Saint settlements in Canada
Populated places established in 1901
Towns in Alberta
1901 establishments in the Northwest Territories
1902 establishments in Alberta
1901 establishments in Alberta